Ince Blundell is a civil parish and a village in Sefton, Merseyside, England.  It contains 24 buildings that are recorded in the National Heritage List for England as designated listed buildings.   Of these, five are listed at Grade II*, the middle of the three grades, and the others are at Grade II, the lowest grade.

The major building in the parish is Ince Blundell Hall, which is listed, together with associated buildings, including its chapel, its gateways, and other structures within its grounds.  Listed buildings outside the grounds include houses, farmhouses and farm buildings, and a medieval cross in the village.

Key

Buildings

References

Citations

Sources

Listed buildings in Merseyside
Lists of listed buildings in Merseyside